Falise may refer to:

Surname
August Falise (1875-1936), Dutch sculptor
Didier Falise (born 1961), Belgian triple jumper

Places
Fališe, village in Tetovo Municipality, Macedonia